John Lamb (25 July 1889 – 1951) was an English professional footballer who played as a half back in the Football League for Luton Town and The Wednesday. He began his career as a centre forward in non-League football with Bolsover Colliery and was converted into a half back at The Wednesday.

Personal life 
Lamb served as a private in the Football Battalion of the Middlesex Regiment during the First World War. After the war, the effects of wounds received on the Somme prematurely ended his Football League career in 1921.

Career statistics

References

1889 births
Date of death missing
English footballers
Association football midfielders
Bolsover Colliery F.C. players
Sheffield Wednesday F.C. players
Luton Town F.C. players
Matlock Town F.C. players
English Football League players
Brentford F.C. wartime guest players
British Army personnel of World War I
Middlesex Regiment soldiers
Date of birth missing
Military personnel from Derbyshire

People from Clay Cross
Footballers from Derbyshire
Association football forwards
1951 deaths